William de Moray (died c. 1300), Pantler of Scotland, Lord of Bothwell, Walston and Smailholm, was a Scottish noble.

He was a son of Walter de Moray. His younger brother Andrew de Moray, was Justiciar of Scotia. He provided homage to Edward I of England in 1292 and 1296 and held the position of Pantler of Scotland. William died without issue around 1300. He was succeeded by his great-nephew Andrew.

Notes

References

13th-century Scottish people
13th-century births
Year of birth unknown
1280s deaths
Year of death uncertain
Moray
De Moravia family
Clan Murray